Belit Nejat Onay (born 15 January 1981) is a German politician of Turkish origin for the Alliance 90/The Greens. He was elected Mayor of Hanover in 2019, and took office on 22 November.

Role in national politics
Onay was born in Goslar. In the negotiations to form a so-called traffic light coalition of the Social Democratic Party (SPD), the Green Party and the Free Democratic Party (FDP) on the national level following the 2021 German elections, he was part of his party's delegation in the working group on social policy, co-chaired by Dagmar Schmidt, Sven Lehmann and Johannes Vogel.

Onay was nominated by his party as delegate to the Federal Convention for the purpose of electing the President of Germany in 2022.

Other activities

Corporate boards
 Deutsche Messe AG, Ex-Officio Member of the Supervisory Board (since 2020)
 Sparkasse Hannover, Ex-Officio Member of the Supervisory Board (since 2019)

Non-profit organizations
 Islamkolleg Deutschland (IKD), Member of the Board of Trustees (since 2021)

References

External links
 Personal website

Living people
1981 births
People from Goslar
University of Hanover alumni
Alliance 90/The Greens politicians
German politicians of Turkish descent
Mayors of Hanover